Dan Pița (born 11 October 1938 in Dorohoi, Botoșani County, Romania) is a Romanian film director and screenwriter.

Career
Pița has directed several award-winning films since 1970, including the 1985 hit Pas în doi, which won an Honourable Mention at the 36th Berlin International Film Festival. In 1987, he was a member of the jury at the 37th Berlin International Film Festival. In 1992, Pița also won the Silver Lion (Leone d'Argento) at the 49th Venice Film Festival for Hotel de Lux.

Filmography
 Kira Kiralina (2013)
 Ceva bun de la viață (2011) Something Good Out of Life
Femeia visurilor (2005) 
Second Hand (2005) 
Omul zilei (1997) The Man of the Day  
Eu sunt Adam (1996) 
Pepe & Fifi (1994) 
Hotel de lux (1992) Luxury Hotel
Autor anonim, model necunoscut (1989) Anonymous Author, Unknown Model
Noiembrie, ultimul bal (1989) The Last Ball in November
Rochia albă de dantelă (1988) The White Lace Dress (USA) 
Pas în doi (1985) Paso Doble
Dreptate în lanțuri (1983) Chained Justice (USA) 
Faleze de nisip (1983) Sand Cliffs adaptation of the novel Sand Days/Zile de Nisip by Bujor Nedelcovici
Concurs (1982) The Contest
Prea tineri pentru riduri (1982) Too Young for Wrinkles
Pruncul, petrolul și ardelenii (1981) The Oil, the Baby and the Transylvanians
Bietul Ioanide (1979) Memories from an Old Chest of Drawers
Mai presus de orice (1978) This Above All
Profetul, aurul și ardelenii (1978) The Prophet, the Gold and the Transylvanians
Tănase Scatiu (1976) A Summer Tale 
Filip cel Bun (1975) Filip the Kind
Duhul aurului (1974) Gold Fever, Lust for Gold
August în flăcări (1973) (TV) August in Flames
Nunta de piatră (1972) (segment "At a Wedding") The Stone Wedding
Apa ca un bivol negru (1970) Black Buffalo Water 
Viața în roz (1969) La vie en rose
Dupaamiază obișnuită (1968) An Ordinary Afternoon 
Paradisul (1967) Paradise

References

External links 

 http://www.kinokultura.com/specials/6/caliman.shtml

1938 births
Living people
People from Dorohoi
Romanian film directors
Romanian screenwriters